Abu Dhabi International Airport  is an international airport in the Emirate of Abu Dhabi, the capital of the United Arab Emirates.

It has three operational passenger terminals: Terminal 1 (divided into Terminals 1A and 1B), Terminal 2, and Terminal 3, served exclusively by Etihad Airways, the country's second flag carrier airline and the second largest airline in the UAE after Emirates. More than 30 airlines offer service to over 120 destinations in more than 60 countries.

History

Early years
The airport was first conceived in 1974, in response to the government's plans to modernize the then brand new nation. At the time, Al Bateen Airport (then called Abu Dhabi International Airport) was the main international airport serving the city (Abu Dhabi Airfield was the other old airport). Sheikh Zayed bin Sultan Al Nahyan had realized that it was hard to access the airport, as it was located on Abu Dhabi Island and that the island at the time was connected to the mainland by only one bridge. Also, the city was expanding at the time, making it harder for the airport to expand.

During the late 1970s, a location for the building site was strategically located, so it could be easily accessible. Construction started by 1979 and the airport was inaugurated on January 2, 1982. The old airport's name was changed to Al Bateen airport and the new airport was given its previous name.

The new airport included a circular satellite terminal (with aerobridges) with a single connection to a semi-circular terminal. This design allowed more aircraft to park simultaneously. During the late 1990s and early 2000s, substantial work was carried out on the satellite terminal, to cater for the increase in passenger numbers, including widening the passenger waiting areas and creating extra parking spots. The main terminal also underwent some external changes, especially on the outer facade.

Development since the 2000s
With the withdrawal of support for regional airline Gulf Air after nearly five decades, Etihad became the new airline to be based at the airport. It received full support from the UAE government and has come a long way since its inaugural flight in 2003. Previous Gulf Air CEO James Hogan also transferred to Etihad.

Terminal 2 was built and opened in September 2005 to relieve the pressure on the main terminal. Terminal 2, however, does not have aerobridges and uses buses to move passengers between aircraft and the terminal building. A second runway (Runway 13L/31R) was opened in October 2008 to cater to increased traffic. Terminal 3 was opened in January 2009. It is primarily used by Etihad Airways. The new Terminal 3, a AED 1 billion (US$270 million) interim facility, was designed to allow for the airport's passenger growth before the planned opening of the new Midfield Terminal in December 2017 (which was eventually deferred by two years). Used predominantly by Etihad Airways, the terminal boosted the airport's seven million passenger per year capacity to 12 million. It also added 10 new gates, two of which are Airbus A380 compatible.

During the early years of operation, there were no means of getting to the airport from the cities except for private vehicle or taxis. With the creation of Abu Dhabi's bus network in the late 2000s and 2010s, city-to-airport bus services were introduced.

In December 2011, the government of Abu Dhabi signed a letter of intent to build a United States border preclearance facility similar to pre-clearance customs facilities in Canada, Aruba, Bermuda, the Bahamas, and Ireland. Etihad operated its first flight to the U.S. from the facility January 25, 2014. In 2011, the airport was awarded 2nd Best Airport in Middle East of the Airport Service Quality Awards by Airports Council International. The airport celebrated its 30th anniversary in 2012.

Rotana Jet was another airline based at the airport; however, it suspended all flights indefinitely in 2017.

Facilities

Terminals
Abu Dhabi International Airport consists of three passenger terminals named Terminals 1, 2 and 3:

Terminal 1 is the oldest facility, featuring a bi-level arrivals and departures area. The nine main gates (3–11) are equipped with jetbridges and located in a circular gate area while the check-in and arrivals facilities are located in a separate main building connected to this satellite. There are also several bus boarding gates, and passengers whose planes arrive at a remote stand are bused here.
Terminal 2 is a newer facility to the east of Terminal 1 and not connected to it. It features 19 check-in counters, 3 bus-boarding gates and two baggage claim belts and is mostly used by low-cost carriers.
Terminal 3 is the newest addition and a direct expansion to the western side of Terminal 1. It is a brick-shaped, bi-level facility featuring a duty-free and food court area as well as departure gates 32–35 and 58–61, and bus gates 28–31 and 36–57. The majority of passengers are bused to their airplanes as only 8 of its 33 gates are equipped with jetbridges. Terminal 3 is capable of handling the Airbus A380s, mainly for Etihad Airways.

New Midfield Terminal
After several delays, development work is ongoing on a new passenger terminal, the main building and centerpiece of the new airport, to be between the two runways and known as the Midfield Terminal. The Midfield Terminal will increase the airport's passenger capacity to more than 30 million per year, with options for this to double in capacity to 60 million. An additional facility is under consideration that would take the capacity to 80 million. The new facility will cover a floor area of over 735,000 square meters making it one of the largest airport terminal buildings in the world when it opens. The general exterior of the terminal was designed by international architecture firm Kohn Pedersen Fox Associates. 

The new terminal was due to open on 7 July 2017, then pushed back to early 2019 in time for the 2019 Special Olympics, was then again delayed until the last quarter of 2019 but did not. Due to the COVID-19 pandemic the opening date was pushed yet again to sometime in mid-to-late 2021; instead, on 5 July 2021 a major construction contract was cancelled. The contract was with a consortium which comprises United Arab Emirates-based Arabtec, Turkey's TAV Insaat and Athens-based Consolidated Contractors Company (CCC), with Abu Dhabi-headquartered Trojan had been awarded the contract to finish the terminal's construction instead. As of August 2022, the new terminal is in its final stages of construction, however the operator did not want to specify a new scheduled opening date.

Former city terminal
A check-in facility was operated in downtown Abu Dhabi, for travelers who wanted to check in at the downtown city centre before they travelled to the airport. This facility, known as the City Terminal, resembled an airport terminal building with lounge and transport facilities. After having checked in at the City Terminal, travellers could arrive at the airport just one hour before the departure of their flight. This facility closed in October 2019.

A further check-in facility was operated by Etihad Airways at the Etihad Travel Mall on the outskirts of Dubai near Noor Bank metro station. This has since closed.

Runways
Abu Dhabi International Airport has two parallel runways, 13R/31L and 13L/31R.

Expansion
The expansion master plan projects include a third  parallel runway,  from the existing runways, a new  tower between the two runways with the new Air Traffic Control centre, enhanced cargo and maintenance facilities, and other commercial developments on the land immediately adjacent to and north of the airport. Close to the new cargo facilities, land has been allocated for commercial activities, business parks, and property developments. Aircraft maintenance facilities will continue to be concentrated on the south side of the existing airport. The plan sets aside land for the growth of other operators such as Royal Jet and Abu Dhabi Aviation. Among other aspects of the project, when completed, are the design of remote aircraft stands complete with airfield ground lighting and hydrant fuel.

US border preclearance
Abu Dhabi International Airport has United States border preclearance facilities since 26 January 2014, the only airport in the Middle East to have such a facility. Passengers on direct flights to the United States are processed for entry before they board their flight so that when they arrive in the U.S. they are treated as domestic arrivals. This facility is similar to those in selected Canadian, Caribbean and Irish airports.

Airlines and destinations

Passenger
The following airlines operate regular scheduled and charter flights to and from Abu Dhabi:

Cargo

Statistics

Passenger figures

Busiest routes
Busiest international routes to and from Abu Dhabi Airport (2021)

Ground transportation

Road
Abu Dhabi International Airport is connected to the Emirate and its surroundings, including Dubai and Al Ain, by a highway network. Route E20 directly passes the airport. Car rental, taxis and dedicated chauffeur services are available.

Public transport
The Department of Transport provides five bus routes from the airport throughout Abu Dhabi which run 24 hours a day, including lines A1 and A2 which leads to the city center. Etihad Airways additionally provides a coach service from Abu Dhabi International Airport to Al Ain and Downtown Dubai. The airport's new midfield terminal will be connected to the Abu Dhabi Metro, but no construction has commenced for the metro, light rail or BRT.

Accidents and incidents
 On 23 September 1983, Gulf Air Flight 771 crashed while on approach to Abu Dhabi International Airport. All 112 passengers and crew on board were killed. A bomb going off in the baggage hold of the aircraft was the cause of the accident.
 In May 1997, a Gulf Air plane from Bombay airport crashed at the airport. No deaths were reported.
 On 26 July 2018, Houthi rebels in Yemen claimed to have launched a drone attack at the airport. The UAE denied there was any drone attack but stated earlier that there was an "incident" involving a truck which did not disrupt flights or cause any delays. Two other alleged claims on a drone attack on the airport were reported by the Houthis, as well as two attacks on Dubai International Airport, all which were denied and unverified. An investigation by Bellingcat concluded that it was highly likely that a Houthi-led drone attack did not take place in Abu Dhabi and Dubai. According to Reuters, the UAE has an advanced air defense system which utilizes Terminal High Altitude Area Defense (THAAD), designed to destroy short and intermediary range missiles. In 2019, The Wall Street Journal reported that a Houthi drone had exploded at the airport. In May 2019, the Houthi-run Almasirah TV channel broadcast alleged footage of the July 2018 attack.
 On January 17, 2022, a drone strike claimed by Yemen's Iran-aligned Houthi group caused three fuel trucks to catch fire at an oil tanker facility in Abu Dhabi, and at the same time a fire was separately ignited at an extension of the airport, causing minor flight delays.

See also
 Al Ain International Airport
 Abu Dhabi Central Capital District

References

External links

 Official website

Airports in the United Arab Emirates
Buildings and structures in Abu Dhabi
Transport in Abu Dhabi
Airports with United States border preclearance
Central Region, Abu Dhabi
Airports established in 1982
1982 establishments in the United Arab Emirates